Ahed is Arabic for covenant or vow.

Ahed may also refer to:

Organizations
 AHED (company), a former Canadian company
 Al Ahed FC, an association football club based in Beirut, Lebanon
Al Ahed Stadium, a stadium in Beirut, Lebanon

People

People with the given name
 Ahed Joughili (born 1984), Syrian weightlifter
 Ahed Tamimi (born 2001), Palestinian activist

People with the surname
 Mohammad Abdul Ahed (1919–2001), Pakistani architect and painter

See also